Istrabenz is a Slovenian holding company, one of the largest in Slovenia with a total of 73 companies under its management.

Activities 

 Food (24 companies): Droga Kolinska d.d., Grand Kafa AD Beograd, Štark AD Beograd, Palanački Kiseljak AD Smederevska Palanka
 Investments (10 companies)
 Tourism (8 companies): Istrabenz Marina Invest d.o.o., Istrabenz Turizem d.d. Portorož, Marina Koper d.o.o., Istrabenz Hoteli d.o.o. Portorož, Imperial Palace d.o.o.
 Energy (18 companies): Instalacija d.o.o. Koper

History 
Istrabenz entered the Ljubljana Stock Exchange in 1997.

Istrabenz financed the growth of Openad until the holding ran out of cash in 2008.

From 2002 to 2009, the company was headed by Igor Bavčar, Slovenia's former interior minister. In September 2009, Igor Bavčar was detained on suspicions of corruption and money laundering while he was head of Istrabenz.

In July 2010, Istrabenz sold major food manufacturer Droga Kolinska to Atlantic Grupa for €382 million.

In September 2015, Istrabenz sold the Kempinski Palace Portorož for $25 million. In March 2016, Istrabenz Turizem sold the Grand Hotel Adriatic in Opatija to Croatian company Teri-trgovina as part of a disinvestment program.

In June 2016, Istrabenz sold the remaining 51% it held in Istrabenz plini (gas subsidiary) to Italian .

References

External links
 Company website

Holding companies of Slovenia
Oil and gas companies of Slovenia
Conglomerate companies established in 1948
Food and drink companies of Slovenia
Hospitality companies of Europe
Hospitality companies established in 1948